Wimmenum is a hamlet in the Dutch province of North Holland. It is located in the municipality of Bergen, about 2 km north of Egmond aan den Hoef.

It was first mentioned in the late-11th century as Wymnam. The etymology is unknown.

Wimmenum was a separate municipality from 1817 to 1857, when it was merged with Egmond-Binnen. It was home to 84 people in 1840.

The windmill De Wimmenumermolen is a polder mill which was built in 1774. It was in service until 1951 when a pumping station was constructed. In 1967, it was restored and has an auxiliary function. In 2020, the wind mill broke its record with 1,113,518 revolutions.

References

Former municipalities of North Holland
Populated places in North Holland
Bergen, North Holland